is a stadium located in Sapporo, Hokkaido, Japan, and is primarily used for baseball and association football. It is the home field of the association football club Hokkaido Consadole Sapporo, and was also home to the baseball team Hokkaido Nippon-Ham Fighters through the 2022 Nippon Professional Baseball season. It was a football venue for the 2020 Summer Olympics, was the venue for the opening ceremony of the 2017 Asian Winter Games, and was used for 2 matches of the 2019 Rugby World Cup. The stadium was previously a venue of the 2002 FIFA World Cup. The dome will be used as the venue for the opening and closing ceremonies of the 2030 Winter Olympics if Sapporo is successful in their bid.

History

Sapporo Dome opened in 2001 with 41,580 seats. The stadium hosted three games during the 2002 FIFA World Cup, Germany vs Saudi Arabia, Argentina vs England and Italy vs Ecuador; all three matches were in the first round.

The Dome hosted the opening ceremonies of the 2007 FIS Nordic World Ski Championships on February 22 and hosted the closing ceremonies of the championships on March 4. It also made history as being the first venue where both indoor and nighttime skiing events took place for the first time on a world championship or Winter Olympic Games level with competitions in the cross-country skiing sprints (men's and women's individual, and men's and women's team) and the cross-country portion of the 7.5 km sprint event in the Nordic combined. In order to generate snow, the stadium used its turf conversion hovering system to facilitate the snow making process for the skiing competitions. The opening ceremony featured Maki Ohguro, a local artist from Sapporo, Japanese drum demonstrations and other performances paying tributes to local customs and traditions. For the championships, seating capacity was reduced to 30,000.

The Dome was used as a super special stage in Rally Japan in both 2008 and 2010.

In late 2009, renovations with the possibility of increasing the capacity up to 53,796 were finished. These renovations also included space for more food outlets, an extra video screen, two extra changing rooms (to accommodate preseason matches in the NFL International Series, which have up to 75 players per team) and further media area as part of new office buildings attached to the stadium. As part of these renovations, the surface area of the arena itself was decreased to allow for more seating.

Beginning in 2023, the dome will be soccer-only, as the Fighters will move into their own new stadium in nearby Kitahiroshima.

Retractable surface
The Dome switches between two entirely different surfaces: Baseball games are played on an underlying artificial turf field, while association football games are held on a grass pitch that slides into and out of the stadium as needed.

Conversion from baseball to football begins with the storage of the baseball field's artificial turf.  Once finished, a set of lower bowl bleachers rotate from an angled position for baseball to a parallel position.  A set of main bowl seats on one end of the dome then retracts, and the football pitch is slid into the stadium.  The lower bowl is then rotated 90 degrees.  Conversion from football to baseball occurs in reverse. Due to the retraction of seats, the Stadium has a capacity of 40,476 for baseball games.

Other stadiums that feature sliding pitches include the GelreDome in the Netherlands, Veltins-Arena in Germany, the split pitch of London's Tottenham Hotspur Stadium, State Farm Stadium in Glendale, Arizona, United States, and Allegiant Stadium in Paradise, Nevada, United States; however, unlike these four facilities (with the exception of Allegiant Stadum), the Sapporo Dome has a fixed roof.

Details

 Name: Sapporo Dome
 Capacity: 41,484 / 40,476
 Home Team: Hokkaido Consadole Sapporo
 Former home team: Hokkaido Nippon-Ham Fighters (2004–2022)
 Completed: March 2001
 Location: Sapporo City, Hokkaido, Japan
 Building Area: 53,800 m2 Total Floor Area:(Open Arena) 92,453 m2
 Roof Diameter: 245 m Stand Inclination: Max. 30° angle
 Architect: Hiroshi Hara

Access 
 Tōhō Line: 10 minutes walk from Fukuzumi Station.

Major sports matches

2002 FIFA World Cup

2019 Rugby World Cup

See also
Other domed stadiums in Japan:

 Fukuoka Yahoo! Japan Dome in Fukuoka (retractable roof)
 Nagoya Dome in Nagoya
 Kyocera Dome Osaka in Osaka
 Ōita Stadium or "Big Eye" in Oita Prefecture (retractable roof)
 Tokyo Dome in Tokyo

References

External links

  Dome website 
  World Stadiums — Stadium Design — Sapporo Dome Stadium in Sapporo

2002 FIFA World Cup stadiums in Japan
Venues of the 2020 Summer Olympics
Olympic football venues
Toyohira-ku, Sapporo
Retractable-roof stadiums in Japan
Retractable-pitch stadiums
Lattice shell structures
Football venues in Japan
Baseball venues in Japan
Cricket grounds in Japan
Rugby union stadiums in Japan
Hokkaido Consadole Sapporo
Hokkaido Nippon-Ham Fighters
Rally Japan
Sports venues completed in 2001
Sports venues in Sapporo
2001 establishments in Japan
American football venues in Japan
Motorsport venues in Japan
2017 Asian Winter Games Venues